Gavaldón is a surname. Notable people with the surname include:

Angélica Gavaldón (born 1973), Mexican tennis player
Roberto Gavaldón (1909–1986), Mexican film director